Thiago de Mello Tavares (born November 8, 1984) is a Brazilian mixed martial artist and politician who most recently competed in the Lightweight division. An 18-fight veteran of the UFC, he has also fought in the Professional Fighters League and Cage Warriors. During his tenure with the UFC, he was awarded "Fight of the Night" honors four times.

Background
Born and raised in Brazil, Tavares began training in judo at the age of five and Brazilian jiu-jitsu at the age of nine.

Mixed martial arts career

Early career
Tavares made his professional MMA debut in November 2003.  He amassed an undefeated record of 10–0 in his first three years in the sport before being signed by the UFC.

Ultimate Fighting Championship

Lightweight
Tavares entered the UFC with an undefeated record and was highly regarded. Tavares outgrappled fellow UFC-newcomer Naoyuki Kotani to a unanimous decision, followed by a dominant submission victory over Jason Black. Tavares fought perennial contender Tyson Griffin to a unanimous decision loss, the first of his professional career, at UFC 76. They would win Fight of the Night award honors for their performance.

Thiago rebounded with a unanimous decision victory over Michihiro Omigawa at UFC Fight Night: Swick vs Burkman. Tavares was knocked out in his next bout by Matt Wiman and lost a unanimous decision to Kurt Pellegrino nearly three months later. Despite losses, Tavares received Fight of the Night award in both fights. This marked the first time Tavares lost two straight contests after beginning his career with twelve straight wins.

Tavares defeated TUF finalist Manvel Gamburyan via unanimous decision at UFC 94 in a close fight.

Tavares and Nik Lentz fought to a majority draw at UFC Fight Night: Maynard vs. Diaz. Tavares was docked a point in the third round for a second kick to the groin of Lentz. After the fight Lentz was interviewed and had shared with a reporter his belief that Tavares had intentionally kicked him in the groin and happened to crack Lentz's metal cup.

Tavares was scheduled to face Melvin Guillard on May 29, 2010 at UFC 114, but Tavares was forced off the card with an elbow injury. He was replaced by Waylon Lowe.

Tavares was set to face Willamy Freire at UFC Live: Jones vs. Matyushenko taking place August 1, 2010. However, on July 20, 2010, Freire withdrew because of an injury, forcing the bout to be cancelled.

Tavares faced UFC newcomer Pat Audinwood on September 25, 2010 at UFC 119, replacing an injured Aaron Riley. Tavares defeated Audinwood via submission (guillotine choke) in the first round.

Tavares then faced Shane Roller on March 3, 2011 at UFC Live: Sanchez vs. Kampmann.  He lost the fight via KO in the second round. Though Tavares hurt Roller in the first round, he was unable to finish him. During the second round, Tavares was caught by a straight right from Roller that knocked him out.

Tavares defeated Spencer Fisher via second-round TKO on August 27, 2011 at UFC 134.

Tavares faced Sam Stout on January 14, 2012 at UFC 142.  He won the fight via unanimous decision after utilizing takedowns with his top control for most of the fight.

Tavares was expected to face Tony Ferguson on May 5, 2012 at UFC on Fox 3, replacing an injured Dennis Hallman.  However, Tavares was forced out of the bout with an injury and replaced by Michael Johnson.

Tavares was expected to face Dennis Hallman on September 1, 2012 at UFC 151.  However, after UFC 151 was cancelled, Tavares/Hallman was then rescheduled to October 5, 2012 at UFC on FX 5. Just prior to the UFC on FX 5 weigh ins, Dennis Hallman alerted officials and Tavares that he would miss weight by 7 pounds. Tavares was given the option to take the fight anyway at a catchweight.  He stated he would only fight if Hallman could make it within 3 lbs of the 156 lb. limit. Hallman couldn't make it in the allowed time and so the bout was cancelled.

Tavares next faced the undefeated Khabib Nurmagomedov on January 19, 2013 at UFC on FX: Belfort vs. Bisping. He lost the fight via knockout early in the first round.  Following his loss to Nurmagomedov, it was announced that Tavares had tested positive for the banned substance drostanolone during his post-fight drug test and, subsequently, was suspended for nine months retroactive to January 19.

Tavares was expected to face Quinn Mulhern on November 9, 2013 at UFC Fight Night 32.  However, Mulhern pulled out of the bout citing an injury and was replaced by Justin Salas. Tavares won the fight via submission in the first round.

Move to Featherweight
Tavares was expected to face promotional newcomer Zubaira Tukhugov in a featherweight bout on February 15, 2014 at UFC Fight Night 36.  However, Tavares was forced out of the bout citing a rib injury and replaced by Douglas Silva de Andrade.

Tavares was expected to face Tom Niinimäki on May 31, 2014 at UFC Fight Night 41.  However, Tavares pulled out of the bout citing another injury and was replaced by promotional newcomer Niklas Bäckström.

In his eventual featherweight debut, Tavares faced Robbie Peralta on August 16, 2014 at UFC Fight Night 47. Tavares won the fight via submission in the first round after completely dominating Peralta on the ground. The win also earned him his first Performance of the Night bonus award.

Tavares was expected to face Nik Lentz in a rematch on February 14, 2015 at UFC Fight Night 60.  However, Tavares pulled out of the bout in late January citing yet another injury.

Tavares was expected to face Zubaira Tukhugov on June 6, 2015 at UFC Fight Night 68.  However, Tukhugov was replaced by Brian Ortega. Tavares lost the back-and-forth fight via TKO in the third round.  Despite the loss, Tavares was awarded his fourth Fight of the Night bonus award.

Tavares faced Clay Guida on November 7, 2015 at UFC Fight Night 77. He won the fight with a quick submission in the first round. The win also earned Tavares his second Performance of the Night bonus award.

Tavares next faced Doo Ho Choi on July 8, 2016 at The Ultimate Fighter 23 Finale Tavares lost the fight via KO in the first round. Afterwards, the promotion did not re-sign Tavares, making him a free agent.

Post-UFC career
After being released from the UFC, Tavares signed with Aspera FC and faced Mauricio Machado at Aspera FC 49 on February 18, 2017. He won the fight via first-minute knockout.

He was then scheduled to face Fabricio Oliveira at Aspera FC 50 on March 18, 2017, but withdrew from the bout due to an unknown reason.

Professional Fighters League
He was then signed to participate the Lightweight division of the inaugural season of PFL. His regular season begun with facing Robert Watley at PFL 2 on June 21, 2018. In the second round, Watley unintentionally kicked Tavares in the groin rendering him unable to continue after the five minute recovery time. Contrary to the unified rules, Watley was declared as the winner.

His second bout was against Arthur Estrázulas at PFL 5 on August 2, 2018. He won the fight via split decision and advanced to the playoffs.

In the quarter-finals Tavares faced Islam Mamedov at PFL 9 on October 13, 2018. He lost the bout via unanimous decision and was eliminated from the playoffs. However, Mamedov could not continue to the semi-finals and Tavares was brought to replace him against Rashid Magomedov. Tavares lost the bout via second-round technical knockout and was eliminated from the tournament. He subsequently retired from the sport in order to focus in his studies.

Return from retirement
Reaching the clinical phase of his studies, Tavares was able to train more consistently again and was scheduled to return from retirement against Laercio Alves dos Santos at Gladiator CF on July 22, 2020. However, the bout was then rescheduled to take place on October 24, 2020. Tavares won the fight via first-round knockout.

He is next expected to face Jean Carlos Liebl at Gladiator CF 54 on February 6, 2021.

Then, he is also expected to face Mauricio Ariel for the Super Lightweight Championship at Inside Fighters' League 1 on April 11, 2021.

Personal life
Tavares is currently studying medicine at University Institute of Health Sciences - Héctor A. Barceló Foundation in Buenos Aires, Argentina.

Accomplishments
Ultimate Fighting Championships
Fight of the Night (Four times) vs. Tyson Griffin, Matt Wiman, Kurt Pellegrino and Brian Ortega
Submission of the Night (One time) vs. Jason Black
Performance of the Night (Two times) vs. Robbie Peralta and Clay Guida
It's Showtime MMA
2006 It's Showtime MMA Title -70 kg
Rumble of Amsterdam
2006 Lightweight Grand Prix Champion
MMAJunkie.com
2015 June Fight of the Month vs. Brian Ortega

Mixed martial arts record

|-
|Loss
|align=center|24–11–1
|Timur Nagibin
|TKO (punches)
|Russian Cagefighting Championship 9
|
|align=center|3
|align=center|0:50
|Ekaterinburg, Russia
|
|-
|Win
|align=center|24–10–1
|Jean Carlos Liebl
|Submission (arm-triangle choke)
|Gladiator CF 54
|
|align=center|1
|align=center|1:27
|Curitiba, Paraná, Brazil
|
|-
| Win
|align=center|23–10–1
|Laercio Alves dos Santos
|TKO (punches)
| Gladiator CF 53
| 
| align=center| 1
| align=center| 3:38
| Curitiba, Paraná, Brazil
|
|-
|Loss
|align=center|22–10–1
|Rashid Magomedov
|TKO (punches)
|rowspan=2|PFL 9
|rowspan=2|
|align=center|2
|align=center|3:36
|rowspan=2|Long Beach, California, United States
|
|-
|Loss
|align=center|22–9–1
|Islam Mamedov	
|Decision (unanimous)
|align=center|2
|align=center|5:00
|
|-
|Win
|align=center|22–8–1
|Arthur Estrázulas
|Decision (split)
|PFL 5
|
|align=center|3
|align=center|5:00
|Uniondale, New York, United States
|
|-
| Loss
| align=center|21–8–1
| Robert Watley
| TKO (groin kick)
| PFL 2
| 
| align=center| 2
| align=center| 0:35
| Chicago, Illinois, United States
| 
|-
|Win
|align=center|21–7–1
|Mauricio Machado 
|TKO (punches)
|Aspera FC 49
|
|align=center|1
|align=center|0:46
|Balneario Camboriu, Santa Catarina, Brazil
|
|-
|Loss
|align=center|20–7–1
|Choi Doo-ho
|KO (punches)
|The Ultimate Fighter: Team Joanna vs. Team Cláudia Finale
|
|align=center|1
|align=center|2:42
|Las Vegas, Nevada, United States
|
|-
| Win
| align=center| 20–6–1
| Clay Guida
| Submission (guillotine choke)
| UFC Fight Night: Belfort vs. Henderson 3
| 
| align=center| 1
| align=center| 0:39
| São Paulo, Brazil
|
|-
| Loss
| align=center| 19–6–1
| Brian Ortega
| TKO (punches)
| UFC Fight Night: Boetsch vs. Henderson
| 
| align=center| 3
| align=center| 4:10
| New Orleans, Louisiana, United States
| 
|-
| Win
| align=center| 19–5–1
| Robbie Peralta
| Submission (rear-naked choke) 
| UFC Fight Night: Bader vs. St. Preux
| 
| align=center| 1
| align=center| 4:27
| Bangor, Maine, United States
| 
|-
| Win
| align=center| 18–5–1
| Justin Salas
| Submission (rear-naked choke)
| UFC Fight Night: Belfort vs. Henderson
| 
| align=center| 1
| align=center| 2:38
| Goiânia, Brazil
| 
|-
| Loss
| align=center| 17–5–1
| Khabib Nurmagomedov
| KO (punches and elbows)
| UFC on FX: Belfort vs. Bisping
| 
| align=center| 1
| align=center| 1:55
| São Paulo, Brazil
| 
|-
| Win
| align=center| 17–4–1
| Sam Stout
| Decision (unanimous)
| UFC 142
| 
| align=center| 3
| align=center| 5:00
| Rio de Janeiro, Brazil
| 
|-
| Win
| align=center| 16–4–1
| Spencer Fisher
| TKO (punches)
| UFC 134
| 
| align=center| 2
| align=center| 2:51
| Rio de Janeiro, Brazil
| 
|-
| Loss
| align=center| 15–4–1
| Shane Roller
| KO (punches)
| UFC Live: Sanchez vs. Kampmann
| 
| align=center| 2
| align=center| 1:28
| Louisville, Kentucky, United States
| 
|-
| Win
| align=center| 15–3–1
| Pat Audinwood
| Submission (guillotine choke)
| UFC 119
| 
| align=center| 1
| align=center| 3:47
| Indianapolis, Indiana, United States
| 
|-
| Draw
| align=center| 14–3–1
| Nik Lentz
| Draw (majority)
| UFC Fight Night: Maynard vs. Diaz
| 
| align=center| 3
| align=center| 5:00
| Fairfax, Virginia, United States
| 
|-
| Win
| align=center| 14–3
| Manvel Gamburyan
| Decision (unanimous)
| UFC 94
| 
| align=center| 3
| align=center| 5:00
| Las Vegas, Nevada, United States
| 
|-
| Loss
| align=center| 13–3
| Kurt Pellegrino
| Decision (unanimous)
| UFC 88
| 
| align=center| 3
| align=center| 5:00
| Atlanta, Georgia, United States
| 
|-
| Loss
| align=center| 13–2
| Matt Wiman
| KO (punches)
| UFC 85
| 
| align=center| 2
| align=center| 1:57
| London, England
| 
|-
| Win
| align=center| 13–1
| Michihiro Omigawa
| Decision (unanimous)
| UFC Fight Night: Swick vs. Burkman
| 
| align=center| 3
| align=center| 5:00
| Las Vegas, Nevada, United States
| 
|-
| Loss
| align=center| 12–1
| Tyson Griffin
| Decision (unanimous)
| UFC 76
| 
| align=center| 3
| align=center| 5:00
| Anaheim, California, United States
| 
|-
| Win
| align=center| 12–0
| Jason Black
| Submission (triangle choke)
| UFC Fight Night: Stout vs. Fisher
| 
| align=center| 2
| align=center| 2:49
| Hollywood, Florida, United States
| 
|-
| Win
| align=center| 11–0
| Naoyuki Kotani
| Decision (unanimous)
| UFC Fight Night: Stevenson vs. Guillard
| 
| align=center| 3
| align=center| 5:00
| Las Vegas, Nevada, United States
| 
|-
| Win
| align=center| 10–0
| Marc Duncan
| Submission (rear-naked choke)
| It's Showtime 2006 Alkmaar
| 
| align=center| 1
| align=center| 3:39
| Alkmaar, Netherlands
| 
|-
| Win
| align=center| 9–0
| Ulas Aslan
| TKO (punches)
| 2H2H: Pride & Honor
| 
| align=center| 1
| align=center| N/A
| Rotterdam, Netherlands
| 
|-
| Win
| align=center| 8–0
| Adriano Gonçalves
| Submission (triangle choke)
| Sul Fight Championship 1
| 
| align=center| 2
| align=center| 4:12
| Balneário Camboriú, Brazil
| 
|-
| Win
| align=center| 7–0
| Romano de los Reyes
| TKO (punches) 
| Rumble Of Amsterdam 3
| 
| align=center| 2
| align=center| 1:24
| Amsterdam, Netherlands
| 
|-
| Win
| align=center| 6–0
| Mathieu Lawalata
| Submission (heel hook)
| Rumble Of Amsterdam 3
| 
| align=center| 1
| align=center| 0:59
| Amsterdam, Netherlands
| 
|-
| Win
| align=center| 5–0
| Daniel Weichel
| Submission (guillotine choke)
| CWFC: Enter the Wolfslair
| 
| align=center| 3
| align=center| 4:47
| Liverpool, England
| 
|-
| Win
| align=center| 4–0
| Marcio Cesar
| Submission (rear-naked choke)
| Storm Samurai 9
| 
| align=center| 2
| align=center| N/A
| Curitiba, Brazil
| 
|-
| Win
| align=center| 3–0
| Fabiano Adams
| Submission (choke)
| Extreme Combat
| 
| align=center| 1
| align=center| 0:55
| Joinville, Brazil
| 
|-
| Win
| align=center| 2–0
| Johny Johny
| Submission (triangle choke)
| CO: Muay Thai & Vale Tudo
| 
| align=center| 1
| align=center| 4:38
| Curitiba, Brazil
| 
|-
| Win
| align=center| 1–0
| James Jones
| Submission (triangle choke)
| Reality Fighting 5 
| 
| align=center| 2
| align=center| 1:18
| Atlantic City, New Jersey, United States
|

See also
 List of current UFC fighters
 List of male mixed martial artists

References

External links

1984 births
Living people
Brazilian male mixed martial artists
Lightweight mixed martial artists
Mixed martial artists utilizing Brazilian jiu-jitsu
Mixed martial artists utilizing judo
Sportspeople from Florianópolis
Brazilian practitioners of Brazilian jiu-jitsu
People awarded a black belt in Brazilian jiu-jitsu
Brazilian male judoka
Doping cases in mixed martial arts
Brazilian sportspeople in doping cases
Ultimate Fighting Championship male fighters